Cato, New York may refer to either:

Cato (town), New York, located in Cayuga County.
Cato (village), New York, located in Cayuga County within the towns of Cato and Ira.

es:Cato (Nueva York)